Adios Amigos or Adios Amigo may refer to

Film and television
 Adios Amigo, a 1975 American comedy-western film
 Adios Amigos (film), a 2016 Dutch drama
 "Adios Amigos", an episode of Entourage

Music
 Adios Amigo (Marty Robbins album), 1977, and the title track
 Adios Amigos (Ramones album), 1995
 "Adios Amigo", a 1965 song by Jim Reeves

See also
Adiós (disambiguation)